The 1952 Nations motorcycle Grand Prix was the seventh round of the 1952 Grand Prix motorcycle racing season. It took place on 14 September 1952 at the Autodromo Nazionale Monza.

500 cc classification

350 cc classification

250 cc classification

125 cc classification

Sidecar classification

References

Italian motorcycle Grand Prix
Nations Grand Prix
Nations Grand Prix